This is a list of Geostationary Operational Environmental Satellites. GOES spacecraft are operated by the United States National Oceanic and Atmospheric Administration, with NASA responsible for research and development, and later procurement of spacecraft.

Imagery

Satellites

References

GOES